This is a list of the bishops of Jerusalem before the Council of Chalcedon (451), which provoked a schism.

Jewish bishops of Jerusalem

The early Christian community of Jerusalem was led by a Council of Elders, and considered itself part of the wider Jewish community.

Eusebius of Caesarea provides the names of an unbroken succession of thirty-six Bishops of Jerusalem up to the year 324. The first fifteen of these bishops were of Jewish origin (from James the Just through Judas). After the Bar Kokhba revolt (c. 135), Judas ceased to be bishop and all subsequent bishops were Gentiles:

"But since the bishops of the circumcision ceased at this time [after Bar Kokhba's revolt], it is proper to give here a list of their names from the beginning. The first, then, was James, the so-called brother of the Lord; the second, Symeon; the third, Justus; the fourth, Zacchaeus; the fifth, Tobias; the sixth, Benjamin; the seventh, John; the eighth, Matthias; the ninth, Philip; the tenth, Seneca; the eleventh, Justus; the twelfth, Levi; the thirteenth, Ephres; the fourteenth, Joseph; and finally, the fifteenth, Judas. These are the bishops of Jerusalem that lived between the age of the apostles and the time referred to, all of them belonging to the circumcision."

 James the Just (until 62)
 Simeon I (62–107)
 Justus I (107–113)
 Zaccheus (113–???)
 Tobias (???–???)
 Benjamin I (???–117)
 John I (117–???)
 Matthias I (???–120)
 Philip (???–124)
 Senecas (???–???)
 Justus II (???–???)
 Levis (???–???)
 Ephram (???–???)
 Joseph I (???–???)
 Judas (???–135)

Bishops of Aelia Capitolina

As a result of the Bar Kokhba revolt in 135, Hadrian was determined to erase Judaism from Iudaea Province. The province was renamed Syria Palaestina. Jerusalem was left in total ruin, and a new city built nearby called Aelia Capitolina. These gentile bishops (Jews were excluded from the city except for the day of Tisha B'Av), were appointed under the authority of the Metropolitans of Caesarea. Until the setting up of the Patriarchates in 325, Metropolitan was the highest episcopal rank in the Christian church.

 Marcus (135–???)
 Cassianus (???–???)
 Poplius (???–???)
 Maximus I (???–???)
 Julian I (???–???)
 Gaius I (???–???)
 Symmachus (???)
 Gaius II (???–162)
 Julian II (162–???)
 Capion (???–???)
 Maximus II (???–???)
 Antoninus (???–???)
 Valens (???–???)
 Dolichianus (???–185)
 Narcissus (185–???)
 Dius (???–???)
 Germanion  (???–???)
 Gordius  (???–211)Narcissus (restored) (???–231)
 Alexander (231–249)
 Mazabanis (249–260)
 Imeneus (260–276)
 Zamudas (276–283)
 Ermon (283–314)
 Macarius I (314–333), since 325 Bishop of Jerusalem

Bishops of Jerusalem
Jerusalem received special recognition in Canon VII of First Council of Nicaea in 325, without yet becoming a metropolitan see. Also, the Council for the first time established the Patriarchates. The Bishops of Jerusalem were appointed by the Patriarchs of Antioch.

Macarius I (325–333)
Maximus III (333–348)
Cyril I (350–386)
John II (386–417)
Praulius (417–422)
Juvenal (422–458), since 451 Patriarch

In 451 or 452, the anti-Chalcedonian clergy elected a rival bishop, Theodosius, who was forced into exile in 453. For the rival episcopal successions after this date:
Greek Orthodox Patriarch of Jerusalem
Syriac Orthodox Bishop of Jerusalem

References

bishops